Kottanahalli is a small village situated in Doddanaravangala Panchayat of Tumkur District, Karnataka. It was also called Kamadenunagara in olden days.

See also 

 Mallasandra
 Tumkur

Villages in Tumkur district